Bob Bryan and Mike Bryan were the defending champions but decided not to participate.
Andre Begemann and Martin Emmrich won the title, defeating Julian Knowle and Filip Polášek 6–4, 3–6, [10–4] in the final.

Seeds

Draw

Draw

External links
 Main draw

Erste Bank Open - Doubles
2012 Doubles